Founded in 2016, The Charter School was taken over by Trivandrum International School in 2019. This led to the inception of Cochin International School

The Charter School is a CBSE affiliated school, from Kindergarten to Grade 12. Cochin International School follows the International Baccalaureate program and is spread over 12 acres at Upper Kakkanad. The campus has not yet been completed. 

The school motto is ‘Learning is for Life’.  

The teacher-student ratio is 1:20 or less. 

The school's leadership was headed by Principal and Dean, Ms.Molly Cyril.

See also
List of schools in Ernakulam

References

External links

Private schools in Kochi
Private schools in Thiruvananthapuram